Wabo is a Malayo-Polynesian language of Papua, Indonesia.

References

South Halmahera–West New Guinea languages
Languages of western New Guinea